The Palace of the Grand Master of the Knights of Rhodes, also known as the Kastello (from , "castle"), is a medieval castle in the city of Rhodes, on the island of Rhodes in Greece. It is one of the few examples of Gothic architecture in Greece. The site was previously a  citadel of the Knights Hospitaller that functioned as a palace, headquarters, and fortress.

History
According to recent study, in the exact spot in which the palace exists today, there was the foundations of the ancient temple of the sun god Helios, and probably that was the spot where the Colossus of Rhodes stood in the Antiquity. The palace was originally built in the late 7th century as a Byzantine citadel. After the Knights Hospitaller occupied Rhodes and some other Greek islands (such as Kalymnos and Kastellorizo) in 1309, they converted the fortress into their administrative centre and the palace of their Grand Master. In the first quarter of the 14th century, they repaired the palace and made a number of major modifications. The palace was damaged in the earthquake of 1481, and it was repaired soon afterwards.

After the 1522 capture of the island by the Ottoman Empire, the palace was used as a command centre and fortress. 

During the Italian rule of Rhodes, the Italian architect Vittorio Mesturino restored the damaged parts of the palace between 1937 and 1940. It became a holiday residence for the King of Italy, Victor Emmanuel III, and later for Fascist dictator Benito Mussolini, whose name can still be seen on a large plaque near the entrance.

On 10 February 1947, the Treaty of Peace with Italy, one of the Paris Peace Treaties, determined that the recently established Italian Republic would transfer the Dodecanese Islands to Greece. In 1948, Rhodes and the rest of the Dodecanese were transferred as previously agreed. The palace was then converted to a museum, and is today visited by the millions of tourists that visit Rhodes.

In 1988, when Greece held the rotating presidency of the European Economic Community (as the European Union was then known), Greek Prime Minister Andreas Papandreou and the other leaders of the EEC held a meeting in the Palace.

Gallery

See also
Fortifications of Rhodes
Knights Hospitaller
List of Grand Masters of the Knights Hospitaller
Fort St Angelo
Grandmaster's Palace in Valletta

References

7th-century establishments in the Byzantine Empire
7th-century fortifications
Castles in Greece
Gothic architecture in Greece
Grand Master of the Knights of Rhodes
Rhodes under the Knights Hospitaller
Buildings and structures in Rhodes (city)
Medieval sites in Greece
Tourist attractions in the South Aegean
Castles and fortifications of the Knights Hospitaller
Rebuilt buildings and structures
Colossus of Rhodes